Football Club Metalurh-2 Donetsk was the reserve team of Metalurh Donetsk. Metalurh went bankrupt in July 2015.

History
The club initially competed in the Donetsk Oblast competition as FC Metalurh-2 Donetsk.

In 2001 the club entered into the professional leagues to compete in the Second League.

League and cup history
{|class="wikitable"
|-bgcolor="#efefef"
! Season
! Div.
! Pos.
! Pl.
! W
! D
! L
! GS
! GA
! P
!Domestic Cup
!colspan=2|Europe
!Notes
|-
|align=center|2001–02
|align=center|3rd "C"
|align=center bgcolor=tan|3
|align=center|34
|align=center|19
|align=center|9
|align=center|6
|align=center|60
|align=center|36
|align=center|66
|align=center|
|align=center|
|align=center|
|align=center|
|-
|align=center|2002–03
|align=center|3rd "C"
|align=center|6
|align=center|28
|align=center|13
|align=center|4
|align=center|11
|align=center|37
|align=center|38
|align=center|43
|align=center|
|align=center|
|align=center|
|align=center|
|-
|align=center|2003–04
|align=center|3rd "C"
|align=center|13
|align=center|30
|align=center|5
|align=center|8
|align=center|17
|align=center|23
|align=center|56
|align=center|23
|align=center|
|align=center|
|align=center|
|align=center|Club moves to Reserve competition
|}

See also
FC Metalurh Donetsk

External links
Official website

 
FC Metalurh Donetsk
Ukrainian reserve football teams
Defunct football clubs in Ukraine
Football clubs in Donetsk
Association football clubs established in 1996
Association football clubs disestablished in 2004
1996 establishments in Ukraine
2004 disestablishments in Ukraine